Tomorrow's Melody (Swedish: Morgondagens melodi) is a 1942 Swedish drama film directed by Ragnar Frisk and starring Viveca Lindfors, Nils Lundell and Björn Berglund. The film's sets were designed by the art director Bertil Duroj. It was shot at the Centrumateljéerna Studios in Stockholm and the city's PUB department store.

Synopsis
Maj-Lis Wassberg, an upper-class university student, hears about the poor working conditions in a major Stockholm department store. She gets a job there to investigate and encounters a bullying head of department as well as his son Thore Almen who is trying to form a trade union for which he is fired. Discovering that her father is a director at the bank that owns the store, she appeals to him to try and sort things out.

Cast

References

Bibliography 
 Qvist, Per Olov & von Bagh, Peter. Guide to the Cinema of Sweden and Finland. Greenwood Publishing Group, 2000.

External links 
 

1942 films
Swedish drama films
1942 drama films
1940s Swedish-language films
Films directed by Ragnar Frisk
Swedish black-and-white films
Films set in Stockholm
Films shot in Stockholm
1940s Swedish films